Olathe is a city in Kansas and a large suburb of Kansas City.

Olathe may also refer to:

 Olathe, Colorado
 Olathe Township, Johnson County, Kansas
 Olathe School District, in Olathe, Kansas
 The Olathe News
 Naval Air Station Olathe, in Gardner, Kansas